Calcium/calmodulin-dependent protein kinase type 1 is an enzyme that in humans is encoded by the CAMK1 gene.

Calcium/calmodulin-dependent protein kinase I is expressed in many tissues and is a component of a calmodulin-dependent protein kinase cascade.  Calcium/calmodulin directly activates calcium/calmodulin-dependent protein kinase I by binding to the enzyme and indirectly promotes the phosphorylation and synergistic activation of the enzyme by calcium/calmodulin-dependent protein kinase I kinase.

References

Further reading

External links
 

EC 2.7.11